Robert Elter (20 April 1899 – 2 May 1991) was a Luxembourgian footballer. He competed in the men's tournament at the 1920 Summer Olympics.

References

External links
 

1899 births
1991 deaths
Luxembourgian footballers
Luxembourg international footballers
Olympic footballers of Luxembourg
Footballers at the 1920 Summer Olympics
Sportspeople from Luxembourg City
Association football forwards